Callithamniaceae  is a family of red algae (Rhodophyta) in the order Ceramiales. The family was first described by Friedrich Traugott Kützing in 1843.

Description 
Algae in the family Callithamniaceae have filamentous fronds with branches arranged in two rows on opposite sides of a stem and in the same plane,  or radially or in whorls. In the female gametophytes, the procarps are four-celled and there are no sterile cells.

List of genera
According to the Interim Register of Marine and Nonmarine Genera, and AlgaeBase (amount of species per genus)
 Tribe	Callithamnieae 
Aglaothamnion G. Feldman-Mazoyer, 1941 - 30 spp.
Aristoptilon M.H. Hommersand & W.A. Nelson in M.H. Hommersand et al., 2006 - 1 sp.
Aristothamnion J.Agardh, 1892 - 2 spp.
Callithamnion Lyngbye, 1819 - 74 spp.
Carpothamnion Kützing, 1849 - 1 sp.
Diapse Kylin, 1956 - 1 sp.
Falklandiella Kylin, 1956 - 1 sp.
Gaillona Bonnemaison, 1828 - 4 spp.		
Georgiella Kylin, 1956 - 1 sp.	
Heteroptilon M.H. Hommersand in M.H. Hommersand, D.W. Freshwater, J. López-Bautista & S. Fredericq, 2006 - 2 spp.
Hirsutithallia E.M. Wollaston & H.B.S. Womersley in H.B.S. Womersley, 1998 - 6 spp.
Nwynea R.B. Searles in R.B. Searles & C.W. Schneider, 1989 - 1 sp.
Pseudospora Schiffner, 1931 - 1 sp.
 Tribe	Crouanieae  (39)
Crouania  J.Agardh, 1842 - 19 spp.
Crouanophycus A. Athanasiadis, 1998 - 2 spp.
Euptilocladia Wollaston, 1968 - 3 spp.
Gattya Harvey, 1855 - 2 spp.
Gulsonia Harvey, 1855 - 3 spp.
Ptilocladia Sonder, 1845 - 10 spp.
 Tribe	Euptiloteae (15)
Euptilota (Kützing) Kützing, 1849 - 5 spp.
Sciurothamnion De Clerck & Kraft, 2002	1 sp.
Seirospora  Harvey, 1846 - 9 spp.
 Tribe	Gymnothamnieae	 (3)
Gymnothamnion  J.Agardh, 1892 - 3 spp.
 Tribe Perithamnieae  (5)
Perithamnion  J.Agardh, 1892 - 2 spp.
Scageliopsis  E.M.Wollaston, 1981 - 3 spp.
 Tribe	Rhodocallideae  (3)
Psilothallia F.Schmitz, 1896 - 2 spp.
Rhodocallis Kützing, 1847 - 1 sp.
 Tribe	Spyridieae		(17)
Spyridia Harvey, 1833 - 17 spp.

References

External links 
 

Plants described in 1843
Callithamniaceae
Red algae families